Choaspes is an Indomalayan realm and Australasian realm genus of skippers in the family Hesperiidae. They are the only skippers with strongly hairy eyes.

Species
Choaspes benjaminii (Guérin-Méneville, 1843)
Choaspes estrella de Jong, 1980 Philippines
Choaspes hemixanthus Rothschild & Jordan, 1903 Sulawesi, Halamahera, New Guinea
Choaspes furcatus Evans, 1932 Nepal to Burma, Thailand, Laos, Hainan, Malay Peninsula, Palawan
Choaspes illuensis (Ribbe, 1900) New Guinea
Choaspes plateni (Staudinger, 1888)
Choaspes subcaudata (C. & R. Felder, [1867])
Choaspes xanthopogon (Kollar, [1844])

References
Natural History Museum Lepidoptera genus database

External links
Choaspes at funet
Images representing Choaspes at Encyclopedia of Life
Images representing Choaspes  at  Consortium for the Barcode of Life

Coeliadinae
Butterflies of Indochina
Hesperiidae genera
Taxa named by Frederic Moore